Regents College may refer to:

 Regent's University London, a private university.
 Excelsior College, a private college located in Albany, New York, until 2001 called Regents College.

It should not be confused with

 Regent College, Leicester, a sixth form college located in Leicester, England.
 Regent College, an evangelical Protestant graduate school located in Vancouver, British Columbia, Canada.